Bobby Aloysius (born 22 June 1974) is an Indian athlete from Kerala, who competes in the high jump event. Currently, she is residing in Thiruvananthapuram, Kerala. She held the Indian and South Asian records in high jump between 1995 and 2012 of 1.91m. Bobby participated in the 2004 Athens Olympics, won silver in 2002 Busan Asian Games and won gold in the Jakarta Asian Championships.

Personal life
Bobby was born in Chemperi, Kannur, Kerala, India.  Bobby travelled around the world several times and eventually lived in Shrewsbury, United Kingdom until 2009. She had also worked as the Assistant Secretary (Technical) of Kerala State Sports Council in Thiruvananthapuram till 2013. She is married to Shajan Skariah, who is the founder and chief newsreader of an online channel named Marunadan TV. They have three children, Stefan Holm Skariah, Gangotri Skariah and Ritwik Skariah. She is an alumnus of Calicut University.

Career
Bobby established the national record of 1.91m in women's high jump during the Olympic qualifications in 2004 in Chennai. “I badly wanted to qualify for the Olympics and I put everything into that jump in Chennai and cleared 1.91m," she said in an interview at the Maharaja's Stadium in 2011. Her national record remained unbeaten till 2012, when Sahana Kumari cleared 1.92 m for the London Olympics. Bobby also won the women's High Jump event at the National Domestic Circuit Meet held in 2003 in Chennai, in addition to her international wins.
Bobby has also worked with the Kerala state government to improve sports development in her state. Serving as the Assistant Secretary (Technical) of Kerala State Sports Council, Bobby organised the Sports Council's High Jump Carnival, held at Thiruvananthapuram with the athletes performing to heavy music in 2011. She aimed to implement the higher secondary sports quota online allotment scheme during her service. In 2013, she submitted her resignation letter to KSSC as she claimed that they had denied her the opportunity to get appointed to the National Games Office by holding back the order.

Awards 
After applying for the Dhyan Chand Award multiple times and losing the chance to receive it, Bobby was finally awarded with it in 2018. She was presented the award on 25 September by the President of India Ram Nath Kovind at Rashtrapati Bhawan. In one of her interviews, she said "I'm lucky to win it this time. I've been applying for this honour ever since Dhyan Chand Award was instituted in 2002.The honour will motivate me to take coaching seriously. After Nayana James left me after just one year of training under me, I stopped coaching. Now, I am planning to make a comeback to serious coaching."

References 

1974 births
Living people
Malayali people
Indian female high jumpers
21st-century Indian women
21st-century Indian people
Sportspeople from Thiruvananthapuram
Olympic athletes of India
Athletes (track and field) at the 2004 Summer Olympics
Asian Games medalists in athletics (track and field)
Athletes (track and field) at the 2002 Commonwealth Games
Commonwealth Games competitors for India
University of Calicut alumni
Athletes (track and field) at the 2002 Asian Games
Sportswomen from Kerala
Athletes from Kerala
Asian Games silver medalists for India
Medalists at the 2002 Asian Games
Recipients of the Dhyan Chand Award